West Sacramento (also known as West Sac) is a city in Yolo County, California, United States. The city is separated from Sacramento by the Sacramento River, which also separates Sacramento and Yolo counties. It is a fast-growing community; the population was 48,744 at the 2010 census, up from 31,615 at the 2000 census. The traditional industrial center of the region since the Gold Rush era, West Sacramento is home to a diverse economy and is one of the area's top four employment centers.

The United States Conference of Mayors named West Sacramento as the Most Livable City in America in 2014 in the category of cities with fewer than 100,000 residents.

West Sacramento is part of the Sacramento–Arden Arcade–Roseville Metropolitan Statistical Area which has a population (2000) of approximately 1,796,857 (July 1, 2016 estimate placed the population at 2,296,418). Major industries to the region include agriculture, government, and transportation.

History

Gold Rush era 
In 1844, John Schwartz, a Flemish traveler, was the first Euro-American to permanently settle in the area of West Sacramento, which at that time was part of Mexico. He built a shack on the west bank of the Sacramento River six miles (10 km) south of its connection with the American River. John, with the help of his brother George, founded a salmon fishery along the river. In addition to the fishery, they also found the soil to be fertile and began farming and raising livestock. The announcement of the discovery of gold at Sutter's Mill in 1848 brought a multitude of miners to the region. This also coincided with the end of the Mexican–American War.

In 1846, a man named James McDowell bought  from John Schwartz. With his wife, Margaret, and their three daughters, McDowell settled in the area we know today as Broderick. The McDowell family experienced first-hand the violence that the gold rush era brought with it. In May 1849, James McDowell was shot and killed in a barroom argument that he had supposedly started. With the loss of the sole supporter of the McDowell family, Margaret needed to find a way to provide for her family.

In October 1849, Margaret hired a land surveyor to map out , which was then divided into forty one blocks. She sold individual lots within this platted area which she named the "Town of Washington". The first lot was sold to August W. Kaye for $500. During its first ten years, the rural Town of Washington went through a significant increase in business development and shipping activity. One of the first businesses to be established in the town was the California Steam Navigation Company, which was attracted to the area in 1859 by how close the Sacramento River is to it. Other businesses in early Washington included hotels, saloons, and restaurants catering to the needs of people passing through. Many of the travelers making the treacherous journey through the marshlands on their way to Sacramento were appreciative of the rest stop at the Town of Washington.

While Sacramento began to urbanize on the other side of the river, early West Sacramento found its hand at agricultural development. Salmon, sturgeon, catfish, eel, crayfish, and clams proved to be lucrative in this region as fisherman soon found. The river settlement was flourishing, stocking fish markets not only in Sacramento, but in San Francisco as well. In addition, the rich soil of the valley produced abundant crops of corn, melons, cucumbers, and sweet potatoes. The dairy industry also established roots in West Sacramento around this time.

One of the area's most well known dairy farmers was Mike Bryte. Bryte came to California in 1849 to try his hand at gold mining. He didn't make a fortune in gold, but was able to purchase a dairy farm with his findings. When the California Steam Navigation Company came to Washington, Bryte used the steamships to carry his dairy products to various markets within the region. Profits from this allowed Bryte to expand his holdings. Bryte was able to own several thousand acres of land in the area to farm on, as well as raise his many livestock on. Mike Bryte's influence in the community was marked by his election to the Yolo County Board of Supervisors and later as sheriff. During the 20th century, Mike Bryte's property was divided and became known as the community of Bryte.

Developing a city 
In time, the region began to develop. The Town of Washington was renamed Broderick in honor of U. S. Senator David C. Broderick. After 1900, the three communities known as Bryte, Broderick, and West Sacramento were cumulatively known as "East Yolo".

From 1900 to 1920, the population of this area doubled from 1,398 to 2,638. The West Sacramento post office opened in 1915.

These communities officially incorporated as the City of West Sacramento in 1987.

Port of West Sacramento
In June 1963, the Port of Sacramento was opened to deep sea traffic with the completion of the Sacramento Deep Water Ship Channel. The project had been authorized by Congress in 1946 and construction commenced in 1949 on the west side of the river. It has since been renamed The Port of West Sacramento. The Port's main imports include cement and exports include rice.

Geography 

West Sacramento, which lies in Yolo County, is separated from the city of Sacramento and Sacramento County by the Sacramento River.  West Sacramento, incorporated in 1987, consists of three communities that were originally distinct towns, Broderick, Bryte, and West Sacramento (originally just the community north of the port canal and south of the railroads), as well as the Southport area.

Southport, which comprises about half of the city's land area, originally consisted of rural homesteads and small neighborhoods in Arlington Oaks and Linden, but now has a considerable population that resulted from housing booms in the early 1990s and the early 2000s, adding new neighborhoods in Bridgeway, Gateway, River Ranch, and Newport.

Climate 

According to the Köppen Climate Classification system, West Sacramento has a hot-summer Mediterranean climate, abbreviated "Csa" on climate maps.

Businesses

Retail 
In March 2006, IKEA opened a store in West Sacramento near Reed Avenue and Interstate 80 in the Riverpoint Shopping Center. On November 15, 2007, a Home Depot opened in the Riverpoint Shopping Center, next to IKEA. Target opened a new store at the Southport Shopping Center directly across from Nugget Market, an upscale grocery store headquartered in Woodland, California. A Lowe's Home Improvement Center just west of Target, behind Arlington Oaks was completed in February 2008. West Sacramento's premiere businesses include Tony's Fine Foods/UNFI, UPS, Hunter Douglas, Beckman Coulter, FedEX, Holtman of California and Bayer Crop Sciences.

TV stations 
West Sacramento is home to Sacramento-area CBS television station KOVR and The CW station KMAX-TV.  Both stations, owned and operated by CBS, are housed on KOVR Drive.

Newspapers 
The News-Ledger and the West Sacramento Sun are weekly, printed newspapers that serve West Sacramento. The Sacramento Bee has the largest circulation and readership in the city.

Sports 

Sutter Health Park is the home of Sacramento River Cats. It was the home of the former Sacramento Mountain Lions in the defunct United Football League.

West Sacramento is also the home city for the Sacramento Gold team of the National Premier Soccer League.

California Highway Patrol 
West Sacramento is the home of the California Highway Patrol Academy, and the CHP Museum is housed on the same grounds.

In 2007–2008 there were efforts to move the California Highway Patrol official headquarters from Sacramento (in Sacramento County) to West Sacramento (in Yolo County), but these were ultimately unsuccessful.

Education

Washington Unified School District
Public schools and programs operated by the Washington Unified School District currently include:

Elementary schools
 Bridgeway Island
 Elkhorn
 Riverbank
 Southport
 Stonegate
 Westfield
 Westmore Oaks

High schools
 River City High School

Alternative programs
 Independent Study
 Preschool programs
 Washington Adult School
 Yolo Education Center
 Bryte Career and College Training

Charter schools
 Washington Middle College High School

Independent / private schools
 Sacramento Valley Charter School
 Heritage Peak Charter School
 Our Lady of Grace, WestSac
 Lighthouse Charter School

Colleges
 Sacramento City College, WestSac Center

In 2017, West Sacramento launched the West Sacramento Home Run, an education initiative offering universal preschool, college savings accounts for preschool graduates enrolled in the Washington Unified School District, internship opportunities with local businesses/organizations and free first year of college tuition for all West Sacramento high school graduates.

Other businesses 
Raley's, a major grocery store chain in Northern and Central California, has its corporate headquarters in West Sacramento.

The California State Teachers Retirement System pension fund CalSTRS is based in West Sacramento and its headquarters tower on the riverfront is the city's tallest building.

In 2011, mayor Christopher Cabaldon launched an initiative to develop the city as a global food hub and center of food innovation, and several major international companies in the sector made West Sacramento their US or North American headquarters and manufacturing/research centers, including Nippon Shokken, Shinmei Foods, TOMRA, and Bayer Crop Science.

Top employers 
According to the city's 2015 "Comprehensive Annual Financial Report," the top employers in the city are:

Demographics

2010 
The 2010 United States Census reported that West Sacramento had a population of 48,744. The racial makeup of West Sacramento was 29,521 (60.6%) White, 2,344 (4.8%) African American, 798 (1.6%) Native American, 5,106 (10.5%) Asian, 534 (1.1%) Pacific Islander, 6,709 (13.8%) from other races, and 3,732 (7.7%) from two or more races. Hispanic or Latino of any race were 15,282 persons (31.4%).

The Census reported that 48,406 people (99.3% of the population) lived in households, 246 (0.5%) lived in non-institutionalized group quarters, and 92 (0.2%) were institutionalized.

There were 17,421 households, out of which 6,626 (38.0%) had children under the age of 18 living in them, 8,073 (46.3%) were Heterosexual-sex married couples living together, 2,574 (14.8%) had a female householder with no husband present, 1,016 (5.8%) had a male householder with no wife present.  There were 1,307 (7.5%) unmarried Heterosexual partnerships, and 186 (1.1%) Homosexual married couples or partnerships. 4,264 households (24.5%) were made up of individuals, and 1,314 (7.5%) had someone living alone who was 65 years of age or older. The average household size was 2.78.  There were 11,663 families (66.9% of all households); the average family size was 3.37.

The population was spread out, with 13,036 people (26.7%) under the age of 18, 4,435 people (9.1%) aged 18 to 24, 15,129 people (31.0%) aged 25 to 44, 11,363 people (23.3%) aged 45 to 64, and 4,781 people (9.8%) who were 65 years of age or older.  The median age was 33.6 years. For every 100 females, there were 97.7 males.  For every 100 females age 18 and over, there were 95.0 males.

The homeowner vacancy rate was 3.0%; the rental vacancy rate was 7.0%.  28,012 people (57.5% of the population) lived in owner-occupied housing units and 20,394 people (41.8%) lived in rental housing units.

2000 
As of the census of 2000, there were 31,615 people, 11,404 households, and 7,595 families residing in the city. The racial makeup of the city was 64.99% White, 2.57% African American, 1.76% Native American, 7.22% Asian, 0.58% Pacific Islander, 15.99% from other races, and 6.89% from two or more races. Hispanic or Latino of any race were 29.95% of the population.

There were 11,404 households, out of which 34.6% had children under the age of 18 living with them, 45.2% were married couples living together, 15.4% had a female householder with no husband present, and 33.4% were non-families. 27.1% of all households were made up of individuals, and 10.6% had someone living alone who was 65 years of age or older.  The average household size was 2.75 and the average family size was 3.39.

In the city, the population was spread out, with 29.8% under the age of 18, 9.1% from 18 to 24, 27.7% from 25 to 44, 20.7% from 45 to 64, and 12.7% who were 65 years of age or older.  The median age was 34 years. For every 100 females, there were 97.6 males.  For every 100 females age 18 and over, there were 94.2 males.

The median income for a household in the city was $31,718, and the median income for a family was $36,371. Males had a median income of $31,176 versus $30,183 for females. The per capita income for the city was $15,245.  About 17.2% of families and 22.3% of the population were below the poverty line, including 31.8% of those under age 18 and 12.4% of those age 65 or over.

Transportation

Public Transportation

Local and Regional Transit 
West Sacramento, CA falls within the service area of several transportation providers that offer local and regional transit, as well as commuter rail services. The Yolo County Transportation District administers Yolobus, which operates local and intercity bus service 365 days a year in Yolo County and neighboring areas. Yolobus serves Davis, West Sacramento, Winters, Woodland, downtown Sacramento, Sacramento International Airport, Cache Creek Casino Resort, Esparto, Madison, Dunnigan, and Knights Landing. The Sacramento Regional Transit District (SacRT) provides fixed-route bus, light rail, paratransit, and dial-a-ride services throughout the City and County of Sacramento.

West Sacramento On-Demand 
In May 2018, the City of West Sacramento partnered with Via Transportation to launch an on-demand microtransit service. The service, called West Sacramento On-Demand, offers trips anywhere in the city for a flat fare. As of April 2020, rides cost just $1.75 for seniors and riders with disabilities and $3.50 for the general population. Companions can accompany riders for a “plus one” $1 fare, which encourages pooled trips. A $15 weekly pass ($7.50 for seniors and riders with disabilities) covers up to four rides per day. Passengers can request a ride by using a smartphone app or by calling a dispatcher.

Notable people 
 Christopher Cabaldon, longest serving Mayor of West Sacramento from 1998 to 2020
 Malcolm Floyd, NFL Wide Receiver
 Eugene Garin,  contemporary seascape artist
 Willie Jorrín, former World Boxing Council super bantamweight champion
 Burney Lamar, NASCAR driver
 Oleg Maskaev, former World Boxing Council heavyweight champion
 Steve Sax, former LA Dodgers 2nd baseman

See also

 List of municipalities in California

References

External links

 

 
Cities in Yolo County, California
Cities in Sacramento metropolitan area
Populated places on the Sacramento River
Sacramento Valley
Populated places established in 1987
1987 establishments in California
Incorporated cities and towns in California